Alex Carter may refer to:

Alex Carter (cornerback) (born 1994), American football cornerback
Alex Carter (defensive end) (born 1963), American football defensive end
Alex Carter (British actor) (born 1982), British actor
Alex Carter (Canadian actor) (born 1964), Canadian television and film actor
Alexander Carter (1909–2002), Canadian bishop
Alex Carter (Neighbours), fictional character on Australian soap opera Neighbours

See also
Alexandra Carter (born 1987), Canadian voice actress
Alexandra Carter (politician), English politician 
Al Carter (disambiguation)